International Program of Psycho-Social Health Research (IPP-SHR) is an Australian research program based in Queensland which explores the psycho-social dimension of health through examining and reporting on the human experience of serious physical and mental illnesses.

History 

The International Program for Psycho Social Health was established in 2006 by A/Pr Pam McGrath as a research initiative funded by the National Health and Medical Research Council (NHMRC) and CQUniversity. In 2011, the International Program of Psycho-Social Health Research moved to Griffith Health Institute, Griffith University.

Areas of research 
IPP-SHR explores the psycho-social dimension of health through a wide range of topics including: palliative care; haematology/oncology; mental health; acute medicine; bioethics; rural and remote health; Indigenous health; spirituality; paediatrics; birth studies; and service delivery evaluation.

IPP-SHR also produces two industry focused publications including a quarterly review and a weekly podcast.

References

Health research